Pierluigi Oliverio (born 1969) was the 6th district Councilmember on the San Jose City Council.  He was sworn in on March 20, 2007, and left office in 2016.

Background
Pierluigi grew up in San Jose attending K-12 public schools, and obtained his BA and Teaching Credential from San Jose State University. Prior to being elected to the San Jose City Council Pierluigi worked in the semiconductor and software industry.

Political campaigns
In an election held June 5, 2018, Pierluigi Oliverio unsuccessfully ran for the Santa Clara County Supervisor position in District 4 to replace the outgoing Ken Yeager. In the days after the election night, it seemed that Oliverio came in for a second place runoff election by a slim 105-vote  margin However, it became clear that this was a third place showing as the Santa Clara County Registrar of Voters continued its round-the-clock tally of provisional and mailed-in ballots.

Oliverio ran unsuccessfully as a candidate for California's 17th congressional district in the 2016 election, coming in fifth place with 4.2% of the vote.

Two months after losing his run for state congress, Oliverio filed papers in August 2016 to campaign for a seat on the Santa Clara Valley Open Space Authority's board of directors.  He lost against the incumbent in District 4, Dorsey Moore, who won the four-year term for 2016–2020.

In 2014, Oliverio campaigned unsuccessfully in the mayoral race for the City of San Jose, California. He was eliminated from the race in the June primary coming in fourth with just under 10 percent of the vote. 

He is a board member of the Silicon Valley Taxpayer's Association with a term of 2019–2020.

Elected to the City of San Jose's Planning Commission in March 2019, and reelected May 2022.  Elec ted Chair of the City of San Jose's Planning Commission June 2022.

Elected to Willow Glen Neighborhood Association Board in 2018.  

Re-Elected to 4th term on the Santa Clara County Democratic Central Committee in June 2018.

References

External links
 Santa Clara County Supervisor D4 Campaign
 sjdistrict6.com
 San Jose City Council

California Democrats
Living people
1969 births
San Jose City Council members
San Jose State University alumni